Colin Judd (born 3 June 1956) is a former Australian rules footballer who played with Hawthorn in the Victorian Football League (VFL). He later played 134 games for Camberwell in the VFA.

Notes

External links 

Living people
1956 births
Australian rules footballers from Victoria (Australia)
Hawthorn Football Club players
Camberwell Football Club players